The NWA Mid-Atlantic Tag Team Championship was a tag team title defended in the National Wrestling Alliance's NWA Mid-Atlantic territory. The championship was originally created in the summer of 1968 and was originally named the NWA Atlantic Coast Tag Team Championship. During this time, the title was the primary tag team championship that was defended in Mid-Atlantic Championship Wrestling owned by Jim Crockett, Sr. and later by his son, Jim Crockett, Jr. While the current Mid-Atlantic promotion operates primarily out of the same area as the Crockett promotion, they aren't the same as Jim Crockett, Jr. sold his territory to Ted Turner in November 1988. This promotion would then be renamed World Championship Wrestling. The title was relegated to serve as the secondary tag team championship in Crockett's territory after Mid-Atlantic created its own territorial version of the NWA World Tag Team Championship in January 1975 and was used until sometime in 1985 when it was abandoned. In 2000, the title was revived for the Mid-Atlantic territory.

Title history

See also
List of National Wrestling Alliance championships

References

External links
NWA Mid-Atlantic Tag Team title history

Jim Crockett Promotions championships
National Wrestling Alliance championships
Tag team wrestling championships
United States regional professional wrestling championships